Invergowrie is a village on the northwest bank of the Firth of Tay to the west of Dundee. Historically part of Perthshire, it was formerly incorporated as part of the city of Dundee, but is now administered as part of Perth and Kinross.

History
The old parish church, a roofless 16th century building currently in poor condition, survives on a mound in the old kirkyard, by the Gowrie Burn. This site was formerly close to the sea; much land has been reclaimed from the Firth of Tay in recent times, and it is now some way inland. This was an early Christian site, dedicated to St Curetán. An artistically important and well-preserved cross-slab carved on five faces from this site is on display in the Museum of Scotland in Edinburgh. Dating from the early 9th century, the front shows a cross decorated with interlace, the back three stylised clerics, one holding an object which may be a charter with appended seal, above two dragon-like creatures.

This cross-slab was formerly built into a window of the medieval church, along with another smaller, damaged example, also now in Edinburgh (not on display).

The village was formerly part of the estate of Mylnefield. The quarry at Invergowrie supplied important sites around the UK, stone being included in the base of Nelson's column and St Katherine's Docks in London. The quarry workers hit a spring at the beginning of the 20th century and the quarry filled with water. The former quarry can be seen as you leave Invergowrie station by train heading to Perth and now looks like a large lake. Until 1967, the main source of work in the village was a paper mill.

The legend of the Gows o' Gowrie, stones supposed thrown by the devil around Invergowrie. The prophecy comes from a verse by Thomas the Rhymer (circa 1280).
"When the Yowes o' Gowrie come to land,The Day o' Judgement's near at hand"

Where the stones are, if they exist, has not been quite agreed. There is a "Deil's stone" at Greystanes, behind the Hilton hotel, surrounded by a Victorian fence. There is also a lump of rock which used to be called "the Paddock Stone" or the "Fairy Stone" in the wood situated on the Waterside road, near the quarry. It was said another stone was left in Invergowrie Bay, but that is now covered in silt and not visible. The Parish of Longforgan, by Adam Phillips, contains several paragraphs on the subject. The stones are of course glacial deposits. There was also the large Victorian house called "The Gows", now part of the Invergowrie Technology Park.

On 22 October 1979 a rail crash occurred after a warning signal was ignored resulting in the death of five people and 50 injuries.

Geography
Invergowrie is located on the northwest bank of the Firth of Tay, with the Invergowrie Bay located just to the east and south of the village.

Climate
The Mylnefield weather station was owned by the Met Office and is located in Invergowrie.

Transport
Invergowrie railway station serves the village, but only a few services stop there. The station is situated on the Glasgow to Aberdeen Line.

Frequent bus services connect Invergowrie to Dundee, Perth and Fife. Stagecoach Strathtay operate services to Perth, Dundee City Centre and Kirkcaldy

Dundee Airport is situated east of the village, providing flights to London City and Belfast City Airports.

The A85 road runs to the northeast of Invergowrie, while the A90 road runs to the north and northwest of the village.

References

Gauldie, Enid, The Quarries and the Feus, Waterside Press 1981
Phillips, Adam, The Parish of Longforgan, 1895

Villages in Perth and Kinross